Namu is a small fishing port, former cannery town and First Nations community on the coast of British Columbia, Canada. The community's harbour is named Namu Harbour, and a large lake just inland is Namu Lake, which lies in the short drainage basin of the 15 km Namu River, immediately east of which is the small but rugged Namu Range.

Namu was the namesake of the killer whale Namu, who was captured nearby in 1965 and was the second orca ever displayed in captivity.

Pre-contact history

The site of Namu is one of the oldest known sites on the British Columbia coast. Marine hunters lived here 10,000-5800 (cal) BCE.  Evidence from archaeological analysis from the early period at Namu indicate the full establishment of a broad-based marine economy as early as 6000 BP (4000BC). Microblades appear at Namu around 8250 BCE, the farthest south they were generally made and used along the coast. Elements of the more southerly pebble tool tradition also appear at Namu, which appears to have been at the interface of two great regional traditions.

There is no known evidence of large permanent houses, most likely due to rising sea levels along this unstable shore line. Deglaciation and the stabilization of rivers opened spawning grounds and led to the establishment of large salmon runs after 5800 (cal) BCE. Salmon fishing declined somewhat after 2500 BCE because of estuary development and river sedimentation. Still later, the stabilization of sea level led to the development of large tidal flats. People were thus able to add shellfish as a major food resource. This lasted until around 1250 BCE.

Shell middens are often where archaeologists identify organic remains, thanks to their alkaline content, which is a good natural preserver. At Namu, an important burial context has been recovered in the shell midden, dating circa 3400 BC. The presence of this hunter-gatherer cemetery is further evidence of a prolonged sedentism, a characteristic of complex hunter-gatherers. Various stone technologies have been identified at the Namu site. It consisted of celts, microblades and burnishing stones. Many of these tools were made out of materials found in the region such as antlers, bone and rocks.

See also
 Heiltsuk
 Heiltsuk Nation
 Nuxalk
 Nuxalk Nation
List of canneries in British Columbia

References

External links
Photos of Namu from a Kayaking Trip

Unincorporated settlements in British Columbia
Central Coast of British Columbia
Populated places in the Central Coast Regional District
Ghost towns in British Columbia